is a Japanese professional footballer who plays as a centre back or a defensive midfielder for J1 League club FC Tokyo.

Club statistics
.

Honours
Nagoya Grampus
J.League Cup: 2021

References

External links
Profile at FC Tokyo

1993 births
Living people
Fukuoka University alumni
Association football people from Shizuoka Prefecture
Japanese footballers
J1 League players
J2 League players
J3 League players
Cerezo Osaka players
Cerezo Osaka U-23 players
Nagoya Grampus players
FC Tokyo players
Association football midfielders
Universiade bronze medalists for Japan
Universiade medalists in football